Crittenden is an English surname. Notable people with the surname include:

Danielle Crittenden (born 1963), Canadian-American author and journalist
George B. Crittenden (1812–1880), American army officer
Howie Crittenden (1933–2013), American basketball player
Inez Crittenden (1887–1918), American World War I switchboard operator
Jennifer Crittenden (born 1969), American screenwriter and producer
John Crittenden Sr. (1754–1809), American army officer and politician
John J. Crittenden (1787–1863), American politician
Lisa Crittenden, Australian actress
Nick Crittenden (born 1978), English footballer
Nick Crittenden (writer), British writer
Oscar Crittenden, Australian retailer
Paul Crittenden (born 1958), Australian politician
Patricia McKinsey Crittenden (born 1945), American psychologist
Peter Crittenden, British lichenologist
Robert Crittenden (1797–1834), American lawyer and politician
Thomas Leonidas Crittenden (1819–1893), American lawyer, politician and army general
Thomas Theodore Crittenden (1832–1909), American army officer and politician
Thomas T. Crittenden Jr. (1863–1938), American politician
Thomas Turpin Crittenden (1825–1905), American army officer

See also
Javaris Crittenton, basketball player

English-language surnames